Patil may refer to:

 Patil (title), an Indian title native to the states of Maharashtra and Karnataka.
 Patil (surname), a surname used in Maharashtra, Karnataka and Telangana.
 12511 Patil, a minor planet
 Pastil, a Filipino packed rice dish

See also
 Patel, an Indian surname